Sui'an is a town in and the county seat of Zhangpu County, in far southern Fujian province, China. It is the seat of Zhangpu's government, Lower People's Court and local branches of CPC and PSB.

Transportation
Zhangpu Railway Station on the Xiamen–Shenzhen Railway is a few kilometers to the west of town.

The county town is reached by China National Highway 324, and by the provincial-govt-maintained road coming down from the Pinghe county-town to Jiuzhen harbour.

References

Township-level divisions of Fujian
Zhangzhou